A list of trade unions in Spain.

Unions 
 Agrarian Trade Union Federation
 Andalusian Workers' Union
 Central Sindical Independiente y de Funcionarios (CSIF)
 Coordinadora Obrera Sindical (COS)
 Confederación General del Trabajo (CGT)
 Confederación Nacional del Trabajo (CNT)
 Confederación Intersindical Galega (CIG)
 Confederación Sindical Solidaridad Obrera
 Euskal Langileen Alkartasuna (ELA-STV)
 Intersindical Región Murciana
 Intersindical-CSC
 Langile Abertzaleen Batzordeak (LAB)
 Spanish Trade Union Organisation
 Typographic Workers Trade Union
 Unión General de Trabajadores (UGT)
 Unión Sindical Obrera
 Workers Collectives
 Workers in Struggle Collectives
 Workers' Commissions

References 

Trade unions in Spain
Trade unions
Spain